Christiaan Basson (born 30 April 1982) is a South African professional golfer.

Basson was born in Strand, Western Cape. As an amateur he represented South Africa for the Eisenhower Trophy in 2006. He turned professional in 2007 and joined the Sunshine Tour. He picked up his first win on Tour in 2009 at the Coca-Cola Charity Championship. Basson picked up his second victory in 2012 at the Investec Royal Swazi Open.

Professional wins (4)

Sunshine Tour wins (4)

Sunshine Tour playoff record (0–1)

South African national team appearances
Amateur
Eisenhower Trophy: 2006

References

External links

South African male golfers
Sunshine Tour golfers
Sportspeople from Cape Town
White South African people
1982 births
Living people